Tamer Amin (born 10 September 1971) is a former Egyptian television presenter and interviewer for Masr El-Nahrda (Egypt Today), a popular Egyptian live television talk show from Cairo, which airs on the Egyptian National TV (ERTU). He has also had content broadcast on Al Hayat TV.

Positions
Amin is known for being strongly supportive of the Egyptian government. He has expressed his views on a number of issues:

Responding to a question regarding whether or not Egyptian men who marry Israeli women should have their Egyptian citizenship revoked, Amin stated "Everything should be taken from them, not just their citizenship."
In response to a video purported to document a gay wedding ceremony, Amin said "I don’t have a problem with anyone doing something wrong, and keeping it private ... but if that person is proud of it, and doesn’t try to hide it ... that’s a disaster."
Amin expressed support for Egypt and Iran acquiring nuclear weapons, arguing that "As a deterrent. I support Egypt's policy of turning the Middle East into a nuclear-free zone. But if a country like Israel has nuclear weapons, it has a deterrent, and all of us Arabs are afraid of it."

References 

Egyptian television presenters
Egyptian journalists
1974 births
Living people